Nevus psiloliparus is a cutaneous condition, a rare scalp anomaly characterized by a variable degree of alopecia and an excessive amount of adipose tissue.

It is the main hallmark of encephalocraniocutaneous lipomatosis (ECCL), otherwise known as Haberland syndrome.

See also 
 Congenital erosive and vesicular dermatosis
 List of cutaneous conditions

References 

Cutaneous congenital anomalies